Leônidas da Silva (6 September 1913 – 24 January 2004) was a Brazilian professional footballer who played as a forward. He is regarded as one of the most important players of the first half of the 20th century. Leônidas played for Brazil national team in the 1934 and 1938 World Cups, and was the top scorer of the latter tournament. He was known as the "Black Diamond" and the "Rubber Man" due to his agility.

Club career
Leônidas started his career at São Cristóvão. He then played for Carioca side Sírio e Libanez, where he was coached by Gentil Cardoso. When Cardoso left to coach Bonsucesso, he brought Leônidas with him. Between 1931 and 1932, he played for Bonsucesso before joining Peñarol in Uruguay in 1933. After one year, da Silva returned to Brazil to play for Vasco da Gama. He helped them win the Rio State Championship. After playing in the 1934 World Cup, he joined Botafogo and won another Rio State Championship in 1935. The following year, he joined Flamengo, where he stayed until 1941. Once again, in 1939, the team won the Rio State Championship. He was also at the forefront of the movement against prejudice in football, being one of the first black players to join the then-elitist Flamengo team.

Leônidas joined São Paulo in 1942 and stayed at the club until his retirement from playing in 1950.

The bicycle kick
Leônidas is one of several possible players credited for inventing the "Bicycle kick". The first time da Silva used this technique was on 24 April 1932, in a match between Bonsucesso and Carioca. In Flamengo he used this move only once, in 1939, against the Argentinian team Independiente. The unusual volley gained huge fame at the time, propelling it into the football mainstream.

For São Paulo, da Silva used the bicycle kick on two occasions: the first on 14 June 1942, in the defeat against Palestra Italia (currently Palmeiras). Most famously of all, he used it on 13 November 1948, in the massive 8–0 victory over Juventus. The play (and the goal) was captured in an image and is regarded as the most famous picture of the player.
In the 1938 World Cup, he also used the bicycle kick, to the delight of the spectators. When he did it, the referee was so shocked by the volley that he was unsure whether it was within the rules or not.

International career
Leônidas played 19 times for the Brazil national team between 1932 and 1946, scoring 21 goals in total, and scoring twice on his debut. In 1938, he was the World Cup's top scorer with 7 goals, scoring at least three times in the 6–5 extra time win over Poland.

Nevertheless, his performance also made him be frequently fouled by the Poles. For the next match, against Czechoslovakia, he was not in the ideal conditions, but the Brazilian staff, concerned for possible punishment in using Niginho in Leônidas place, preferred to keep Leônidas in the team; Italian Football Federation had warned FIFA about Niginho's irregular condition: this player, who had Italian Citizenship, was still legally attached to Lazio, the club he left without permission in 1936, due to fear of being recruited by the Italian Army to the Second Italo-Ethiopian War. Leônidas managed to score against the Czechs, but his injuries got worse, making him definitely unable to be used in the next game – the semifinal against Italy. Brazil lost the match 2–1 and for many years the coach Adhemar Pimenta was criticized as many fans, not aware of Lêonidas true poor conditions, believed his absence was just an option arrogantly made by Pimenta "to rest the player for the final". This version still circulates, despite the fact that Leônidas had written a letter, which was published by certain newspapers at the time, in which he clarified that Pimenta had no choice but to rest him due to the Niginho affair.

The Niginho affair also prevented either of the players from playing in the semi-final. In their place, Romeu was chosen as the team's improvised center-forward for the match, scoring Brazil's goal late in the game. Leônidas returned for the third place match and scored two more goals in a 4–2 win against Sweden.

1934 World Cup statistics
The scores contain links to the article on the 1934 FIFA World Cup and the round in question. The matches' numbers reflect the number of World Cup matches Leônidas played during his career.

1938 World Cup statistics

The scores contain links to the article on the 1938 FIFA World Cup and the round in question. When there is a special article on the match in question, the link is in the column for round.

Personal life
During the 1938 World Cup, Leônidas was nicknamed Diamante Negro (black diamond). In the next year, Brazilian chocolate manufacturer Lacta purchased from him the right to name a chocolate bar as Diamante Negro. This chocolate brand became a commercial success in Brazil.

Leônidas joined São Paulo as manager the 1950s before leaving football to become a radio reporter and then the owner of a furniture store in São Paulo. He died in 2004 in Cotia, São Paulo, because of complications due to Alzheimer's disease, from which he had been suffering since 1974. He is buried in the Cemitério da Paz of São Paulo.

Honours
Vasco da Gama
 Campeonato Carioca: 1934

Botafogo
Campeonato Carioca, 1935

Flamengo
Campeonato Carioca: 1939

São Paulo

 Campeonato Paulista: 1943, 1945, 1946, 1948, 1949

Brazil
FIFA World Cup: third-place 1938

Individual
FIFA World Cup Golden Boot: 1938
FIFA World Cup Golden Ball: 1938
FIFA World Cup All-Star Team: 1938
IFFHS Brazilian Player of the 20th Century (8th place)

Notes

References

External links

Bonsucesso Futebol Clube players
Botafogo de Futebol e Regatas players
Brazil international footballers
Brazilian expatriate footballers
Brazilian footballers
Brazilian football managers
CR Flamengo footballers
CR Vasco da Gama players
Deaths from dementia in Brazil
Deaths from Alzheimer's disease
Expatriate footballers in Uruguay
Brazilian expatriate sportspeople in Uruguay
São Paulo FC managers
São Paulo FC players
1934 FIFA World Cup players
1938 FIFA World Cup players
1913 births
2004 deaths
São Cristóvão de Futebol e Regatas players
Association football forwards
Footballers from Rio de Janeiro (city)